Michael Anthony Williams (born June 16, 1962) is an American actor and former professional boxer who competed from 1984 to 2000. In the 1990 film Rocky V, he played the role of boxer Union Cane.

Boxing career
Known as "Mercury", Williams turned professional in 1984 and was considered a rising prospect after winning his first 13 fights, including a win over James Tillis. In 1987, he stepped up and lost a split decision to the former champion Tim Witherspoon. The following year, he lost by TKO to Buster Douglas. In the 1990s, he lost to other notable heavyweights Alex Garcia and Corrie Sanders and retired in 2000 after a TKO loss to Lawrence Clay Bey, having won 22 and lost 6 with 14 KO.

Acting career
Williams portrayed the fictional heavyweight champion of the world Union Cane in Rocky V. In the movie, he was soundly defeated in one round by Tommy Gunn. Williams also played background characters in various other films, such as A Soldier's Story, Full Metal Jacket, Another 48 Hrs., Ali, Losing Isaiah, Soldier Boyz, The Boys Club, The Replacements, A Sense of Entitlement and The Brave One. He also appeared in some TV shows, such as Homicide: Life on the Street and The F.B.I. Files.

Professional boxing record

References

External links

20th-century American male actors
African-American boxers
African-American male actors
American male boxers
American male film actors
Living people
National Golden Gloves champions
People from Lafayette, Louisiana
Boxers from Louisiana
Heavyweight boxers
20th-century African-American sportspeople
21st-century African-American people
1962 births